Joseph Martin "Jodie" Mudd (born April 23, 1960) is an American professional golfer who played on the PGA Tour.

Professional career 
Mudd was born in Louisville, Kentucky. He attended Georgia Southern University in Statesboro, Georgia, where he developed  into an honored amateur golfer. Mudd successfully earned a spot on the PGA Tour during 1983 PGA Tour Qualifying School.

Mudd won four PGA Tour events during his career. His top year was 1990, when he finished 5th on the final money list, and won two of the Tour's most prestigious non-majors: the Nabisco Championship and The Players Championship. His best finish in a major championship was T-4 at both The Masters in 1987 and the 1990 Open Championship.

Mudd would then become burned out from the grind of Tour play, and would reduce his schedule before leaving the PGA Tour in 1996.  He made his Champions Tour debut on April 30, 2010, at the Mississippi Gulf Resort Classic, and played in a limited number of Champions Tour events that year. His best finish is T-20 at the 2010 Regions Charity Classic.

Mudd currently resides in Finchville, Kentucky.

Amateur wins (5)
This list is probably incomplete
1979 Kentucky Amateur
1980 Kentucky Amateur, U.S. Amateur Public Links
1981 Sunnehanna Amateur, U.S. Amateur Public Links

Professional wins (6)

PGA Tour wins (4)

PGA Tour playoff record (2–2)

Other wins (2)
1979 Kentucky Open (as an amateur)
1980 Kentucky Open (as an amateur)

Results in major championships

LA = Low amateur
CUT = missed the half-way cut
"T" = tied

Summary

Most consecutive cuts made – 6 (1988 PGA – 1990 Masters)
Longest streak of top-10s – 2 (1990 Open Championship – 1991 Masters)

The Players Championship

Wins (1)

Results timeline

CUT = missed the halfway cut
WD = withdrew
"T" indicates a tie for a place.

U.S. national team appearances
Amateur
Walker Cup: 1981 (winners)

Professional
World Cup: 1990
Four Tours World Championship: 1990

See also
1983 PGA Tour Qualifying School graduates

References

External links

American male golfers
PGA Tour golfers
PGA Tour Champions golfers
Golfers from Kentucky
Sportspeople from Louisville, Kentucky
People from Shelby County, Kentucky
1960 births
Living people
Butler High School alumni